William Walker Robinson (23 June 1870 – 4 July 1940) was a Scottish-born competition swimmer who represented Great Britain at the 1908 Summer Olympics in London.  Robinson swam in the men's 200-metre breaststroke, and came second for the silver medal with a time of 3:12.8.  He was 38 years old at the time of the 1908 Olympics, and was the oldest swimmer to win a medal in Olympic history for 100 years, until the 41-year-old American Dara Torres won three silver medals at the 2008 Olympics.

See also
 List of Olympic medalists in swimming (men)

References

External links

William Walker Robinson – Olympic athlete profile at British Olympic Association 

1870 births
1940 deaths
British male swimmers
Male breaststroke swimmers
Olympic swimmers of Great Britain
Swimmers at the 1908 Summer Olympics
Olympic silver medallists for Great Britain
Medalists at the 1908 Summer Olympics
Olympic silver medalists in swimming